The 1982 Washington Metro train derailment was an incident involving a single Orange Line Washington Metro train during the afternoon rush hour of January 13, 1982, in Downtown Washington, D.C. in the United States. The train derailed as it was being backed up from an improperly closed rail switch between the Federal Triangle and Smithsonian stations, and caused the deaths of three passengers. Several survivors were trapped for hours, and 25 were injured. The incident was the first resulting in a fatality involving the Metro system and remained as the deadliest incident occurring in the system until the June 22, 2009, collision that resulted in nine fatalities.

The incident occurred only 30 minutes after Air Florida Flight 90 crashed at the 14th Street bridge complex, a short distance to the south, taxing emergency responders and paralyzing transportation across the Washington metropolitan area.

Overview

Prior to the accident, at 3:45 p.m. EST (15:45 UTC) on Wednesday, January 13, 1982, a westbound Blue/Orange Line train was offloaded at Federal Triangle station after reporting having a propulsion problem. After turning along the McPherson Square interlocking, some trains were temporarily turning back at McPherson Square station in order to ease up the delays. Following the turn backs, the Operation Control Center attempted to realign the switches at the Smithsonian Interlocking. While the switches going westbound worked, the eastbound switches remained aligned for a crossover use. Due to this, OCC Operators and superiors could not tell the problem. This caused the interlocking signals to show as a red signal and make all trains operate on manual mode. Prior to the derailment, another train (Train 403) went over the points without incident. At 4:15 p.m. EST (21:15 UTC), the OCC instructed the supervisor to stay at the Smithsonian Interlocking until a maintenance employee arrived and then told the supervisor to "unblock the switch." The supervisor was unable to crank the "3B" switch and that the 3B and 3A switches were unblocked but were still in the reverse position. Later, the supervisor blocked and tucked the switches. Then, two trains (Trains 904 and 415) passed through the switches without incident following commands from OCC. At 4:24 p.m. EST (21:24 UTC), the supervisor reported that all the switches were blocked and tucked and OCC allowed all trains to go through. However, the switches were improperly closed.

Train 410 on the Blue/Orange Line was operating on its usual rush hour run between National Airport station and New Carrollton station. The train consists of six 1000 series cars numbered 1029, 1028, 1199, 1198, 1235, and 1234. After holding at the McPherson Square interlocking, the train was able to proceed to Federal Triangle. After arriving at Metro Center station, the train was packed at "crush capacity" with approximately 1320 passengers on the train with 220 passengers in the first car. After departing Federal Triangle, the train was operating on manual mode. OCC then told trains 410 and another train (Train 906) that the supervisor in the tunnel will instruct them. Train 410 made its required stop at short at the signal (Signal D02-02) and the supervisor allowed train 410 to move. After the train was going over the crossover track at Smithsonian Interlocking, the supervisor reported to the train operator to "hold up" 10 seconds after giving the clear. The train stopped over the crossover switches over switch 1B which separated the closed switch from the stock rail. At 4:28 p.m. EST (21:28 UTC), the supervisor informed the OCC that the switch doesn't look right and is going to back the train up over the switches. The supervisor boarded the train in car 1234 and told the operator to remove his key from the operating controls giving power to car 1234 and to the supervisor.

At 4:29 p.m. EST (21:29 UTC), the supervisor applied power to car 1234 and move the train over the switches. While moving over the switches, car 1029 front wheelset derailed along switch 1B. One wheel set followed one track and the rear wheel set followed along the crossover switch. The car traveled diagonally along the switches and onto the crossover tracks and struck the end barrier crushing the car. The train went into a breaking, then began "jerking", and then the supervisor noticed that there was a loss of brake pressure and propulsion power. The train operator of train 410 intercom the supervisor to hold it after realizing there was a derailment but did not apply emergency brakes because he did not recognize that the train derailed or an emergency existed. Another supervisor at Federal Triangle reported to OCC that the third rail power was out at a location and the supervisor on train 410 reported that traction power was dead. The supervisor would report the accident at 4:33 p.m. EST (21:33 UTC) after walked to the back of the train and a minute later, reported that both tracks were blocked and there were passenger casualties.

Response
An off duty WMATA police officer assisted helping passengers, and noticed an arching after alighting from the damaged car. After 5 minutes following the collision, the supervisor informed OCC that he'd try to unload the train. Most passengers did not realize an accident had occurred, and supervisors 31 and 35 decided to evacuate the train. Passengers from the undamaged cars were evacuated 40 to 45 minutes after the derailment. The police officer was given clearance to evacuate passengers from the damaged car after power was shut off from the damaged third rail at 4:57 p.m. EST (21:57 UTC). Fire fighters and medics responded to the incident at 4:34 p.m. EST (21:34 UTC) and the first trucks entered the station at 4:53 p.m. EST (21:53 UTC)

Both Orange and Blue Line service was suspended between McPherson Square and the Federal Center SW stations as a result of the accident. Shuttle buses were deployed to get around the closed stations.

The response to the incident was slowed due to the hazard conditions going on and emergency personnel were already responding to the crash of Air Florida Flight 90 on the 14th Street Bridge thirty minutes earlier. Full service along the Metro did not reopen until the evening of January 15 following the removal of the wreckage from the tunnel.

Fatalities
Out of the 1320 passengers, three people were killed and 25 people were injured. The three fatalities marked the first accident resulting in a fatality involving the Metro system and remained as the deadliest incident occurring in the system until the June 22, 2009, collision that resulted in nine fatalities.

Aftermath

Following the investigations during the months following the incident, the NTSB and WMATA officials attributed the accident to operator error. The investigation revealed that a Metro supervisor committed 11 errors, including failing to properly monitor the malfunctioning switch responsible for the derailment itself, and the train operator failed protocol after passing through the switch. Additional failures occurred at the Metro control center relating to the derailment as well. Additionally, Metro evaluated reinforcing the train vehicles with additional steel in order to provide for greater protection from side impacts in the cars. 

Prior to the accident, Metro policy called for passengers to remain in the cars until rescue personnel arrived. This was based on concerns posed by the 750-volt third rail that powers the trains in addition to possible abuse by pranksters. Following the incident, Metro reversed its policy and by 1985 began the installation of emergency handles to allow passengers to escape a car in the event of fire.

Car 1029 was destroyed in the accident and was scrapped on site. The switches and 200 feet (60 meters) of track were also destroyed and about 80 feet of third rail track needed to be repaired. Two  Automatic Train Control Circuits loops were destroyed and other signal work were damaged. The total costs in damages were at $1,325,000 dollars. Car 1028 was later converted into work service and into a feeler car that checks system clearances. The car was retired in April 2016.

See also
 Incidents on the Washington Metro

References

Railway accidents in 1982
Railway accidents and incidents in Washington, D.C.
History of Washington, D.C.
Accidents and incidents involving Washington Metro
1982 in Washington, D.C.
Derailments in the United States
January 1982 events in the United States
Orange Line (Washington Metro)